Limnomedusa macroglossa (common name: rapids frog) is a species of frog in the family Alsodidae, in the monotypic genus Limnomedusa. It is found in southern Brazil, northeastern Argentina, Uruguay, and northern Paraguay.

Limnomedusa macroglossa are found in open and forested areas on rocky soil along rivers. Tadpoles are found in temporary river-side pools and slow-flowing water.

It is threatened by habitat degradation due to agricultural activities, water pollution, hydroelectric development, and pine plantations. For example, the Itaipu Dam destroyed populations in Paraná.

References

External links

Alsodidae
Amphibians described in 1841
Taxa named by André Marie Constant Duméril
Taxa named by Gabriel Bibron
Amphibians of Argentina
Amphibians of Brazil
Amphibians of Paraguay
Amphibians of Uruguay
Taxonomy articles created by Polbot